See You Tomorrow may refer to:

 See You Tomorrow (novel), a 2013 novel by Tore Renberg
 See You Tomorrow (2016 film), a Chinese-Hong Kong romantic comedy film
 See You Tomorrow (2013 film), an Italian comedy film
 See You Tomorrow (album), a 2020 album by The Innocence Mission

See also 
 See You Tomorrow, Everyone, a 2013 Japanese film